The 1896 Paris–Tours was the inaugural edition of the Paris–Tours cycle race and was held on 17 May 1896. The race started in Paris and finished in Tours. The race was won by Eugène Prévost.

General classification

References

1896 in French sport
1896